Nanorana rarica (common names: Rara paa frog, Rara Lake frog) is a frog species in the family Dicroglossidae. It is endemic to western Nepal. Its type locality is the eponymous Rara Lake located in the Rara National Park.

Description
Adult males measure , subadult males , and subadult females  in snout–vent length. The snout is rounded. The tympanum is not very distinct whereas the supratymapnic fold is prominent. Adult males have enlarged forelimbs. During the reproductive period, adult males have black, horny nuptial spines on their chest and forelimbs. The fingers are not webbed. The toes are long and webbed to their tips, although the webbing is strongly incurved between the toes. Preserved individuals are greyish above and have warts with blackish spots. There are numerous blackish markings on the head. The upper parts of the limbs have crossbars. The lower parts of the body and the limbs are whitish, while the throat is greyish.

They have a large oral disc and a muscular tail with not so well-developed caudal fin.

Habitat and conservation
The habitat and ecological requirements of this species are poorly known. Threats to this species are not known. In addition to the Rara National Park, it might also occur in the Chitwan National Park.

References 

rarica
Amphibians of Nepal
Endemic fauna of Nepal
Amphibians described in 2001
Taxonomy articles created by Polbot